Peter des Roches (died 9 June 1238) (Latinised as Petrus de Rupibus ("Peter from the rocks")) was bishop of Winchester in the reigns of King John of England and his son Henry III. He was not an Englishman, but rather a native of the Touraine, in north-central France.

Biography
Towards the end of Richard I's reign, Peter became Lord Chamberlain and an influential counsellor. He held the ecclesiastical offices of Archdeacon of Poitiers, treasurer of Poitiers, and was a precentor of the diocese of Lincoln in 1204.

In early 1205, through John's influence, Peter was elected to the see of Winchester. His election was disputed but, on appeal, confirmed on 25 September 1205 by Pope Innocent III.  Peter was consecrated on 24 March 1206. Nonetheless, the new bishop stood by John's side during the whole period of the papal interdict set upon him due to John's refusal to accept Stephen Langton as Archbishop of Canterbury despite Papal warning.

In 1213 Peter was made Chief Justiciar in succession to Geoffrey Fitz Peter. This promotion was justified by the fidelity with which Peter supported the king through the First Barons' War. However, by 1215, Hubert de Burgh was Chief Justiciar. In 1216, Peter was named Sheriff of Hampshire.

At the battle of Lincoln in 1217 Peter led a division of the royal army and earned some distinction by his valour; but he played a secondary part in the government so long as William Marshal held the regency. After Marshal's death in 1219 Peter led the baronial opposition to Hubert de Burgh, with varying success. At first the justiciar was successful.

Peter was responsible for founding several monasteries in England and France, including Titchfield Abbey and Netley Abbey, both in Hampshire, England, and La Clarté-Dieu in Poitou, France. He gave his protection to the first group of Dominican friars to come to England in 1221.

In 1225 a plot to ship Eleanor of Brittany, who as cousin to Henry III always posed a potential threat to the crown and was thus viewed as a state prisoner and then confined at Bristol Castle, away to France, was reported. The plot might have been false and only fabricated to discredit Peter, and he eventually fell out of royal favor in spring 1234.

Crusading bishop

Peter participated in the Sixth Crusade alongside William Briwere, who was Bishop of Exeter. An army of other crusaders accompanied them to the East, although whether they were English or mercenaries recruited on the Continent is unclear. The contingent left from Brindisi in August 1227. Both bishops were influential advisors to Frederick II the Holy Roman Emperor even though Pope Gregory IX had ordered that no one collaborate with Frederick, who was at the time excommunicated. Both bishops ignored the papal orders and worked closely with Frederick's agents and Frederick himself. The financial resources both bishops brought were especially appreciated by the crusaders. Both bishops witnessed the treaty of 18 February 1229 with the Sultan of Cairo that restored Jerusalem to the Christians, the Treaty of Jaffa. After the crusade, he spent time in Italy.

Peter died on 9 June 1238.

Legends
The Lanercost Chronicle relates that Peter, out hunting one day, encountered King Arthur, dined with him, and asked for a token of their meeting. Arthur told him to close his hand, then open it, whereupon a butterfly flew out. For the rest of his life Roches was able to repeat this miracle, so that he became known as the Butterfly Bishop.

Citations

References
 
 British History Online Bishops of Winchester accessed on 2 November 2007
 British History Online Precentors of Lincoln accessed on 2 November 2007
 
 
 
 
 
 

1238 deaths
Bishops of Winchester
13th-century English Roman Catholic bishops
Justiciars of England
Christians of the Fifth Crusade
Christians of the Sixth Crusade
English people of French descent
High Sheriffs of Hampshire
Year of birth unknown